Angel Esquire is a 1908 crime mystery novel by the British writer Edgar Wallace. The wealthy owner of a gambling establishment leaves his money to whichever of his potential heirs can solve a complex puzzle. The title comes from the Scotland Yard detective Christopher Angel, who becomes involved with the case.

Film Adaptations
 A 1919 British silent film Angel Esquire directed by William Kellino
 A 1964 West German film The Curse of the Hidden Vault directed by Franz Josef Gottlieb, part of a long-running series of Wallace adaptations

References

Bibliography
 Clark, Neil. Stranger than Fiction: The Life of Edgar Wallace, the Man Who Created King Kong. Stroud, UK: The History Press, 2015.
 Goble, Alan. The Complete Index to Literary Sources in Film. Walter de Gruyter, 1999.

1908 British novels
Novels by Edgar Wallace
British crime novels
British novels adapted into films
Novels set in London